The Magician is a 2015 South Korean period fantasy film directed by Kim Dae-seung. The film was released in December 2015.

Plot
A story of the famous magician in Joseon Era who fell in love with a princess who is a fiancé of the prince of the Qing dynasty.

Cast

Main
Yoo Seung-ho as Hwan-hee
Go Ara as Cheong-myeong
Kwak Do-won as Gwi-mol

Supporting

Jo Yoon-hee as Bo-eum
Jang Yoo-sang as Meok-soi	
Lee Jin-kwon as Hwan-hee's equipment team member	
Lee Geung-young
Park Cheol-min
Jo Dal Hwan
Son Byong-ho
Yeom Hye-ran

Reception
The film debuted in sixth place at the Korean box-office and grossed  on its opening week.

References

External links
 
The Magician at Lotte Entertainment

Films set in the Joseon dynasty
Films about magic and magicians
2010s Korean-language films
Lotte Entertainment films
2010s romantic fantasy films
South Korean romantic fantasy films
2010s South Korean films